Fragnes-La Loyère is a commune in the Saône-et-Loire department of eastern France. The municipality was established on 1 January 2016 and consists of the former communes of Fragnes and La Loyère.

See also 
Communes of the Saône-et-Loire department

References 

Communes of Saône-et-Loire